Dolchamar is a rock band formed in London and currently based in Finland that performs in the language Esperanto.

Members

Members  
Patrik Austin – vocals, guitar
Hannu Linkola – drums, percussion
Sebastian Dumitrescu – bass
Andrei Dumitrescu – synthesizer

Former members 
Leena Peisa (2003–2005) – synthesizer, vocals

is a hip hop song by the Esperanto band Dolchamar, on the album . The title comes from the chorus challenging,  ("Are you ready for the coming of Dolchamar?"). The punchline  is an idiomatic way of asking one whether they are ready.

Albums 
Trejn Tu Noŭer (2009)
Trejn Tu Noŭer
2Gether 4Awhile
M.T.R.
River
Clavis
Ni Festis Unu Nokton
Experimento música
La Pordisto
Ho Abio
-if-
Des Pli
La Fariseo
Rebela Sono (2005)
Junaj idealistoj
Himno de Esperhe
Akcidentoj
Ni chiuj ni
...Kaj chi tio povas ighi nenio
Kontra krusadanto
Solaj paroj
Subamighi
Simia kaptilo
Kr3yza festema injo
Chinokta sento
En Grekia
Elektronika kompilo (2003) – Dolchamar contributed two titles
Lingvo Intermonda (2000) (part of Kolekto 2000)
Malbonulo
Ĉu vi pretas
Urbega nimfo
Pacman
Mi volas pli
...kaj pli
Tunel' tra la terLingvo intermonda
F--iĝu!Kun ikso (demo)''' (1999)MalbonuloPacmanMi volas pli''

References

External links 

Finnish rock music groups
Esperanto music
Esperanto-language singers
Finnish indie pop groups